Masticophis flagellum  flagellum, commonly known as the Eastern coachwhip, is a subspecies of M. flagellum, a nonvenomous, colubrid snake, endemic to the southern United States.

Distribution
The subspecies ranges from North Carolina to Florida in the east, and from eastern Kansas to eastern Texas in the west.  They are notably absent from the Mississippi Delta, which divides their range into two separate groupings.

Description
They are among North America's largest native snakes. The head and neck are usually black, fading to tan posteriorly. Some specimens may lack the dark head and neck pigmentation. Their smooth scales and coloration give the appearance of a braided whip, hence the common name.

Habitat
The subspecies can be found in a wide variety of habitats, but is most abundant in the southeastern coastal plain.  Its preferred habitat includes sandy pine woodlands, pine-palmetto flatwoods, cedar glades, and along creeks, marshes and swamplands. M. flagellum adults and juveniles can be found in suburban neighborhoods where development encroaches on favorable habitats A study done in southwestern Georgia found that the average home-range for the coachwhip is around 102.9 ± 28 ha.

Behavior & diet
The Eastern coachwhip is an active, fast-moving snake. This colubrid snake can reach speeds up to 5.8 km/h with their streamlined body 4. It is diurnal and hunts it prey by smell and sight.  It frequently hunts with its head raised above the ground and vegetation, and unlike most snakes, visually locks onto its prey's position before capture. Eastern coachwhips do not constrict their prey but will manipulate it to eat head first4.  Following capture, the snake swallows its prey alive.  It has strong jaws with rows of small, inward slanting teeth.  It has sometimes been observed to beat its prey against the ground in an apparent effort to stun it prior to swallowing. Prey items include birds, large insects, lizards, other snakes, and small mammals.

Reproduction
The breeding seasons spans from June through August, in which females produce one clutch of 4-24 eggs with an average of 11. Males reach sexual maturity at age 1 whereas females don't attain sexual maturity until age 3. Courtship behavior from males instigates copulation with a female, which can last up to 130 min. Mating system is polyandrous, meaning that although females will only produce one clutch of eggs, they will mate with multiple males over the breeding period. Males have been observed displaying territorial behavior in an attempt to prevent any further copulation from other males. The gestation period is around 77.5 days after which the female lays the eggs in a small animals burrow, no parental care is shown.

Myth
A common myth is that the Eastern coachwhip will intentionally attack people and whip them with its tail.  This is false.  In truth, when disturbed this snake will usually quickly flee. It will sometimes vibrate the tip of its tail among the ground litter, making a sound suggestive of a rattlesnake. If trapped, it will aggressively defend itself, striking repeatedly and biting.

References

Colubrids
Fauna of the Southeastern United States
Reptiles of the United States
Taxa named by George Shaw